= ZZAJ =

Swedish pop group

- Years active: 1986–1993
- Past members: Anna Nederdal, Billy Bolero, Christian Callert, Mats Gunnarsson

ZZAJ was a Swedish pop group, active at between 1986 and 1993. Main group members were singer Anna Nederdal and guitarist/composer/producer Billy Bolero (Lars Hansson). The sound of ZZAJ was a mix of groovy and smooth, close to the sound of Sade. All lyrics were in Swedish. ZZAJ released three albums, ZZAJ (1988), Scirocco (1989) and 3 (1993), before they disbanded. A compilation CD, Epilog, was released in 1995. After the split, Nederdal made another record, with Max Schultz in 1995, and then disappeared from the public eye. However, she now has a MySpace page. Billy Bolero runs a small record company, Bolero Records.

== Discography ==
=== Albums ===
- ZZAJ (1988)
- Scirocco (1989)
- 3 (1993)
- Epilog (1987–1993) (1995)

=== Singles ===
- "Om du kommer" (1987)
- "Tänker på dig" (1987)
- "För min skull?" (1989)
- "(Du som var) min bäste vän" (1989)
- "Lev nu" (1993)
- "Vi hade något" (1993)
